Plymouth Theatre or Plymouth Theater may refer to:

 Plymouth Theatre (Boston)
 Plymouth Theatre (Worcester)
 Gerald Schoenfeld Theatre, New York City, formerly the Plymouth Theatre
 H Street Playhouse, Washington, D.C., formerly the Plymouth Theater